The Laois county football team represents Laois in men's Gaelic football and is governed by Laois GAA, the county board of the Gaelic Athletic Association. The team competes in the three major annual inter-county competitions; the All-Ireland Senior Football Championship, the Leinster Senior Football Championship and the National Football League.

Laois's home ground is O'Moore Park, Portlaoise. The team's manager is Billy Sheehan.

The team last won the Leinster Senior Championship in 2003 and the National League in 1986. Laois has never won the All-Ireland Senior Championship.

History

Laois contested the second ever All-Ireland Senior Football Championship (SFC) final in 1889.

In 1926, the county won the final of the first National Football League competition, defeating Dublin.

Laois's only other appearance in an All-Ireland SFC decider was in 1936.

Laois defeated Monaghan by a point in the 1985–86 National Football League final. Liam Irwin and Colm Browne both won All Stars for their performances that year. However, Wicklow knocked the team out of the Leinster SFC.

During the 1990s Laois had a number of successes at minor and under-21 level, including All-Ireland Minor Football Championships in 1996 and 1997.

During the mid-2000s Laois football became a strong force at all age levels.

Under former Kerry and Kildare manager Mick O'Dwyer, Laois finished as National Football League runner-up and Leinster Senior Football Championship winner in 2003. Laois would go on to contest the Leinster Senior Football Championship Final again in 2004 (lost after a replay) and 2005 (lost by one point). During the same period the minor county team won the All-Ireland Minor Football Championship again in 2003 and the Leinster Minor Football Championship in 2004, 2005 and 2007, while the under-21 county team won the Leinster Under-21 Football Championship in 2006 and 2007.

In 2006, Mick O'Dwyer's management of Laois ended and former Limerick manager Liam Kearns replaced him. Laois reached the finals of both the O'Byrne Cup and Leinster SFC in his first season as manager: calls for Kearns to be sacked after one season, with former players and club delegates saying "the man has to go", went unheeded.

Seán Dempsey replaced Kearns as manager after two years in 2008. Despite a poor first season, with disciplinary problems surfacing in the panel, Kildare knocking the team out of the Leinster Senior Football Championship and Down knocking the team out of the All-Ireland Senior Football Championship, Dempsey was unexpectedly retained as manager for one more year. Dempsey had led the Laois minor team to the 2003 All-Ireland title and had commenced a major re-building exercise in 2009 but without success.

Justin McNulty replaced him for the 2011 season. After three seasons in charge, McNulty stepped down to be replaced by Tomás Ó Flatharta.

Ó Flatharta lasted until 2015, resigning after a Leinster SFC quarter-final loss to Kildare and an All-Ireland SFC qualifier exit against Antrim. Mick Lillis from Clare replaced him. Lillis led Laois to the bottom of Division 2, a Leinster SFC quarter-final exit and then an All-Ireland SFC qualifier exit to Clare before he resigned in 2016. He also used seven substitutes in a win, causing the game to be replayed, complained about a fixture against Dublin being held at Nowlan Park and dropped Gary Walsh when he cursed at him after being substituted. Peter Creedon was the next manager; he too did not last long, exiting under heavy criticism from county board delegates, with Mick Lawlor claiming the county would be set "back by five or six years" if Creedon were not ousted. He went, amid allegations of a drinking culture within the squad, Laois having been relegated to Division 4 and knocked out of the All-Ireland SFC by Clare.

John Sugrue spent two seasons managing the team, guiding them to two promotions that brought them from Division Four to Division Two of the National Football League, making Round Four of the All-Ireland SFC qualifiers in both years and bringing Laois to the 2018 Leinster Senior Football Championship final before departing after the 2019 season.

Current panel

Currently abroad: Stephen Attride
INJ Player has had an injury which has affected recent involvement with the county team.
RET Player has since retired from the county team.
WD Player has since withdrawn from the county team due to a non-injury issue.

Current management team
Manager: Billy Sheehan, appointed October 2021

Coaches: Chris Conway (Arles/Kilcruise), Brian "Beano" McDonald (Arles/Killeen)

Managerial history
Laois have a history of appointing "foreign" managers, with Mick O'Dwyer proving to be the most successful; O'Dwyer led Laois to the 2003 Leinster SFC (a first in 57 years) and then to three All-Ireland SFC quarter-finals in his four years in charge. However, by 2015, Laois had also acquired a reputation for appointing managers who lasted two years or less, with journalist Martin Breheny commenting that "there seems to be an inflated view of self-worth in the county" and that the manager "becomes the easy scapegoat" as a result of those heightened expectations.

Players

Notable players

Records

Most appearances

1st and 2nd: Ross Munnelly, Michael Lawlor

3rd: John O'Loughlin: 167 appearances

All Stars
Laois has 5 All Stars.

1986: Colm Browne, Liam Irwin
2003: Fergal Byron, Joe Higgins, Tom Kelly

Honours

National
All-Ireland Senior Football Championship
 Runners-up (2): 1889, 1936
National Football League
 Winners (2): 1925–26, 1985–86
 Runners-up (1): 2003
 Semi-finalists (5): 1952, 1978, 1994, 1995, 1997
All-Ireland Senior B Football Championship
 Winners (1): 1993
All-Ireland Junior Football Championship
 Winners (1): 1973
All-Ireland Under-21 Football Championship
 Runners-up (3): 1964, 1998, 2007
All-Ireland Minor Football Championship
 Winners (3): 1996, 1997, 2003
 Runners-up (3): 1932, 1967, 1998

Provincial
Leinster Senior Football Championship
 Winners (6): 1889, 1936, 1937, 1938, 1946, 2003
 Runners-up (15): 1929, 1940, 1943, 1947, 1951, 1959, 1963, 1968, 1981, 1985, 1991, 2004, 2005, 2007, 2018
O'Byrne Cup
 Winners (5): 1978, 1987, 1991, 1994, 2005
Leinster Junior Football Championship
 Winners (5): 1907, 1941, 1968, 1973, 1993
Leinster Under-21 Football Championship
 Winners (8): 1964, 1969, 1982, 1987, 1994, 1998, 2006, 2007
 Runners-up (4): 1975, 1986, 1999, 2009
Leinster Under-20 Football Championship
 Runners-up (2): 2019, 2020
Leinster Minor Football Championship
 Winners (9): 1932, 1966, 1967, 1996, 1997, 1998, 2004, 2005, 2007
 Runners-up (7): 1933, 1964, 1968, 1973, 1995, 2003, 2016

References

 
County football teams